The Faraday Society was a British society for the study of physical chemistry, founded in 1903 and named in honour of Michael Faraday. In 1980, it merged with several similar organisations, including the Chemical Society, the Royal Institute of Chemistry, and the Society for Analytical Chemistry to form the Royal Society of Chemistry which is both a learned society and a professional body.  At that time, the Faraday Division became one of six units within the Royal Society of Chemistry.

The Faraday Society published Faraday Transactions from 1905 to 1971, when the Royal Society of Chemistry took over the publication.

Of particular note were the conferences called Faraday Discussions, which were published under the same name. The publication includes the discussion of the paper as well as the paper itself. At the meeting, more time is given to the discussion than to the author presenting the paper as the audience are given the papers prior to the meeting. These conferences continue to be run by the Royal Society of Chemistry.

In addition to its presidents, key figures at the Faraday Society included George Stanley Withers Marlow, Secretary and Editor of the society from 1926 to 1948,
and his successor Frederick Clifford Tompkins. Tompkins served as Editor until 1977, and as the President of the Faraday Division of the amalgamated Royal Society of Chemistry from 1978 to 1979.
Prior to the amalgamation, Tompkins received valuable assistance from D. A. Young, who became Editor as of 1977.

Presidents

 Sir Joseph Swan: 1903–1904
 Lord Kelvin: 1905–1907
 Sir William Henry Perkin: 1907
 Sir Oliver Lodge: 1908–1909
 Sir James Swinburne: 1909–1911
 Sir Richard T. Glazebrook: 1911–1913
 Sir Robert Abbott Hadfield: 1913–1920
 Professor Alfred W Porter: 1920–1922
 Sir Robert Robertson: 1922–1924
 Sir Frederick George Donnan: 1924–1926
 Professor Cecil Henry Desch: 1926–1928
 Professor Thomas Martin Lowry: 1928–1930
 Sir Robert Mond: 1930–1932
 Professor Nevil Vincent Sidgwick: 1932–1934
 William Rintoul: 1934–1936
 Professor Morris William Travers: 1936–1938
 Sir Eric Keightley Rideal: 1938–1945
 Professor William Edward Garner: 1945–1947
 Professor Arthur John Allmand: 1947–1948
 Sir John Lennard-Jones: 1948–1950
 Sir Charles Goodeve: 1950–1952
 Sir Hugh Taylor: 1952–1953
 Professor Ronald George Wreyford Norrish: 1953–1955
 Ronald Percy Bell: 1956–1957
 Sir Harry Work Melville: 1958
 Dr Edgar William Steacie: 1959
 Sir Harry Work Melville: 1960
 Sir Cyril Norman Hinshelwood: 1961–1962
 Professor Alfred Rene Ubbelhode: 1963–1964
 Sir Frederick Sydney Dainton: 1965–1966
 Professor Cecil Bawn: 1967–1968
 Professor Geoffrey Gee: 1969–1970
 Professor John Wilfrid Linnett: 1971–1972

References

See also
 Marlow Award

1903 establishments in the United Kingdom
1980 disestablishments in the United Kingdom
Defunct learned societies of the United Kingdom
Physics education in the United Kingdom
Physics societies
Chemistry societies
Royal Society of Chemistry
Michael Faraday
Scientific organizations established in 1903
Organizations disestablished in 1980
History of chemistry